Veikko Lahti (7 December 1926 – 28 July 2014) was a Finnish wrestler. He competed at the 1952 Summer Olympics and the 1956 Summer Olympics.

References

External links
 

1926 births
2014 deaths
Finnish male sport wrestlers
Olympic wrestlers of Finland
Wrestlers at the 1952 Summer Olympics
Wrestlers at the 1956 Summer Olympics
People from Janakkala
Sportspeople from Kanta-Häme
World Wrestling Championships medalists